The Church of St. John the Baptist and St. John the Evangelist, since 1935 a Minor Basilica, and since 1992 the Cathedral of Toruń Diocese, was formerly the main parish church of the Old Town of Toruń, Poland.

One of three Gothic churches of the town, it is built from brick, an aisled hall with a monumental west tower. The first church from the 13th century was a small hall without aisles and with polygonal presbytery. This was replaced by aisled hall church in the first half of the 14th century, which has been rebuilt many times and extended until it reached its present form at the end of 15th century. The interior is richly decorated and furnished. The earliest painted decorations in the presbytery date back to the 14th century and depict the Crucifixion and the Last Judgement. One of the side chapels is connected with Nicolaus Copernicus. There is a 13th-century baptismal font, supposedly used for baptizing the astronomer, 16th-century epitaph to him, and 18th-century monument. At the tower hangs Tuba Dei, the third-largest bell in Poland, cast in 1500.

External links

 Internet Site of Toruń Diocese 
 Cathedral Basilica of SS. Johns in Toruń 
Photos of SS. Johns cathedral in Toruń 

Roman Catholic cathedrals in Poland
Buildings and structures in Toruń
Basilica churches in Poland
Churches in Kuyavian-Pomeranian Voivodeship